Mikael Bertil Dyrestam (born 10 December 1991) is a professional footballer who plays as a defender for Najran. Born in Sweden, he represents the Guinea national team. He previously represented the Sweden national team before switching allegiance to Guinea.

He has formerly played for IFK Göteborg, Aalesunds FK, NEC, Kalmar FF and Xanthi.

Club career
Born in Gothenburg with Guinean roots, Dyrestam spent six years at IFK Göteborg, where he made 67 appearances. He left the club in the summer of 2013, after his contract had expired. In February 2014, it was reported a move to Bolton Wanderers had fallen through and that he was close to signing for their Championship rivals Derby County.

In March, Dyrestam moved to Norwegian side Aalesunds FK on a free transfer. After a lengthy injury spell, he made his official debut for Aalesunds FK in a 3–0 win against Sandnes Ulf on 12 June 2014. On 16 January 2019, he signed a year-and-a-half contract with Greek Super League club for an undisclosed fee. 

On 20 June 2022, Dyrestam joined Saudi Arabian club Al-Adalah.

On 28 January 2023, Dyrestam joined Saudi Arabian club Najran.

Career statistics

International

Honours
IFK Göteborg
Svenska Cupen: 2012–13

References

External links
 
 

1991 births
Living people
Citizens of Guinea through descent
Swedish people of Guinean descent
Guinean footballers
Swedish footballers
Footballers from Gothenburg
Association football defenders
Dual internationalists (football)
Guinea international footballers
Sweden under-21 international footballers
Sweden youth international footballers
Sweden international footballers
2021 Africa Cup of Nations players
2019 Africa Cup of Nations players
IFK Göteborg players
Kalmar FF players
Aalesunds FK players
NEC Nijmegen players
Xanthi F.C. players
Sarpsborg 08 FF players
Al-Adalah FC players
Najran SC players
Allsvenskan players
Eliteserien players
Eredivisie players
Super League Greece players
Saudi Professional League players
Saudi First Division League players
Swedish expatriate footballers
Swedish expatriate sportspeople in Norway
Guinean expatriate sportspeople in Norway
Expatriate footballers in Norway
Expatriate footballers in Greece
Swedish expatriate sportspeople in Saudi Arabia
Guinean expatriate sportspeople in Saudi Arabia
Expatriate footballers in Saudi Arabia
Expatriate footballers in the Netherlands